Magdalena Świerczyńska (born 4 April 1998) is a Polish badminton player. Świerczyńska trained at the Baranowo, and was the bronze medalist at the 2017 European Junior Championships in the mixed doubles event partnered with Paweł Śmiłowski. She won her first senior international title at the 2017 Slovak Open in the mixed doubles event.

Achievements

European Junior Championships 
Mixed doubles

BWF International Challenge/Series (3 titles, 8 runners-up) 
Mixed doubles

  BWF International Challenge tournament
  BWF International Series tournament
  BWF Future Series tournament

References

External links 
 

1998 births
Living people
Sportspeople from Poznań
Polish female badminton players
Badminton players at the 2019 European Games
European Games competitors for Poland